The Allpahuayo antbird (Percnostola arenarum) is a species of bird in the family Thamnophilidae. It is endemic to northeastern Peru.

Its natural habitat is subtropical or tropical dry forests.

References

Antbird, Allpahuayo
Percnostola
Taxonomy articles created by Polbot
Birds described in 2001